Karl Wilhelm Hübner (17 June 1814, Königsberg - 5 December 1879, Düsseldorf) was a German landscape and genre painter, in the Romantic style.

Life and work 
His father was a construction worker. He initially studied art with the portrait painter, in his hometown. Thanks to his support, Hübner was able to gain admission to the Kunstakademie Düsseldorf in 1837. His instructors there included Wilhelm von Schadow and Karl Ferdinand Sohn.

He graduated in 1841 and established a studio in the Pempelfort district, and soon became associated with the Düsseldorfer Malerschule. There, he married Caroline Dorn. They had several children. His daughter, Maria, married the businessman Franz Georg Groll, while she was still underage. Two of his sons went to the United States. His eldest, also became a painter.

In 1844, he created his best known work: , inspired by an uprising staged by the weavers of Silesia earlier that same year; an event which would also inspire Heinrich Heine to write his poem of the same name ("The Silesian Weavers"). It was shown throughout Germany. Although it was well received, some art critics complained that, by taking the side of the weavers, he was engaging in "" (propaganda).

In 1847, he made an extensive study tour of the United States. The sketches he made formed the basis for many of his later paintings. In 1848, he was instrumental in creating  a new artists' association which, upon his suggestion, was named "Malkasten" (Paintbox). He served as its Chairman for several years. In 1864, King Wilhelm I named him a Professor. Later, he received the Order of the Red Eagle.

Selected paintings

References

Further reading 
 
 Friedrich Müller, " Hübner, Karl Wilhelm", In: Die Künstler aller Zeit en und Völker: oder, Leben und Werke der berühmtesten Baumeister, Bildhauer, Maler, Kupferstecher … etc. Vol.2: F–L, Ebner & Seubert 1860, (Online) @ Google Books
 
 Lilian Landes: Carl Wilhelm Hübner (1814–1879) – Genre und Zeitgeschichte im deutschen Vormärz. Deutscher Kunstverlag, Munich, 2008, 
 Kunstmuseum Düsseldorf, Galerie Paffrath: Lexikon der Düsseldorfer Malerschule,  Vol.2: Haach–Murtfeldt. Bruckmann, Munich 1998,

External links 

 More works by Hübner @ ArtNet
 

1814 births
1879 deaths
19th-century German painters
19th-century German male artists
German male painters
German genre painters
Artists from Königsberg